"Safe" is the first single by American Christian and gospel singer Phil Wickham from his third studio album Heaven & Earth, which features MercyMe’s frontman Bart Millard. The single has made it into the top 20 on Billboard’s Christian AC and Soft AC/Inspirational charts and reached #4 on the Billboard's Christian songs chart on January 3.

Background

Collaboration

Reception

Critical response
"Safe" has received extremely positive review from most critics.

Kevin Davis from Christian Music Review writes that Safe "serve[s] to encourage, strengthen and remind listeners that they are not alone as [the lyrics] say, 'You will be safe in His arms, You will be safe in His arms, the hands that hold the world are holding Your heart, this is the promise He made He will be with You always, when everything is falling apart you will be safe in His arms.' " 

"The first time I listened to Phil’s single Safe, I was amazed over how the message connected and really appreciate its relevance to all that is going on in the world these days," says WAY-FM Network Program Director, Tate Luck. "The sound is fresh and Bart Millard’s participation is a great touch!" 

" Safe certainly does live up to its name in terms of being a song that will tickle the fancies of Contemporary Christian radio programmers looking for something different to play. Don’t get the song wrong, though; Wickham’s bright baritone overflows with passion as he sings about how safe we are in the arms of our Savior." -Gannsdeen.com

Chart performance
The song has reached #4 on the Billboard's Christian songs chart on January 3, and made it up to #31 and #32 Top 300 iTunes Christian & Gospel Song Downloads/Top 300 iTunes Inspirational Song Downloads respectively, the song also entered top 10 spot on the USA Today Christian chart, and #7 on the Top 10 Christian Music Hits Chart of Christian Music About on its debut week.

References

2009 singles
Gospel songs
2009 songs
Phil Wickham songs
Songs written by Phil Wickham